This is a list of finalists for the 2000 Archibald Prize for portraiture (listed is Artist – Title).

Finalists
As well as the usual Archibald with its set criteria, there was a Sporting Archibald which had a focus on sport due to the 2000 Sydney Olympics.

 Chris Antico – The Captain: Mark Taylor (cricket captain)
 Michael Bell – The Sandman (comedian Steve Abbott)
 Simon Benz – Anna Wilson (cyclist)
 Melissa Beowulf – Ken Done (painter)
 David Bromley – Strongest man of the games (Dean Lukin, weightlifter)
    Tom Carment – Presbyterian self-portrait
    Tom Carment – Don Idle, footballer
    Adam Cullen – Portrait of David Wenham (Winner: Archibald Prize 2000)
    Adam Cullen – Portrait of Mark Occhilupo (surfer)
 Max Cullen – Geoffrey Rush (actor)
    Elisabeth Cummings – May Barrie
    Geoffrey Dyer – Christopher Koch (author)
    Esther Erlich – Never been better
    David Fairbairn – Portrait of Victoria Hahn
 Nic Fern – Vicki Wilson (netball player)
    Julie Fragar – Self-portrait with the artist: Julie Fragar, Chuck Close and security
 Nicholas Harding – Portrait of John Bell
 Juliet Holmes a Court – Portrait of George (George Gregan, rugby player)
    Colin Husband – Paul Bennett
 Glenda Jones – Nova Peris-Kneebone (Gold Medalist with Australian Hockey Team)
    Robin Lawrence – Andrea Durbach
    Bill Leak – 'Are you with me''': portrait of Sir Les Patterson
 Kerrie Lester – Susie Maroney, True Blue Sue (swimmer)
    Barbara Licha – Smile Keith Looby – Anne Summers (journalist)
 Mathew Lynn – Dr John Yu
 Lewis Miller – Ronald Dale Barassi (AFL footballer)
 Lewis Miller – Self-portrait
 Ann Morton – Edwin Carr 'Old Gold' (athletics)
 Henry Mulholland – Padriac P. McGuinness
 David Naseby – Kostya Tszyu (boxer)
 Paul Newton – Portrait of David Campese (rugby player)
 Evert Ploeg – Louise Sauvage (wheelchair athlete)
 Jenny Sages – Each morning when I wake up I put on my mother's face Garry Shead – Sasha Grishin (art critic)
 Andrew Sibley – Marilyn Peddell (lawnbowls)
 Ian Smith – Ray Hughes getting his desserts Michael Snape – Stephen Mori
 Kim Spooner – 'blue' (Kerry O'Brien)
 Anne Spudvilas – Leigh Hobbs
 Ann Thomson – Portrait of the artist as a painting Branca Uzur – Paul Byrnes
 John R Walker – William Wright
 Peter Wegner – Portrait of Professor Graeme Clark
 Peter Wegner – Portrait of Darren Gauci (jockey)
 Jan Williamson – Tom Carroll (surfer)
 Louise Wood – Determination – Michael Klim (swimmer)
 Huihai Xie – Johnny Raper – A living legend'' (rugby league player)

See also
Previous year: List of Archibald Prize 1999 finalists
Next year: List of Archibald Prize 2001 finalists
List of Archibald Prize winners

External links
Archibald Prize 2000 finalists official website

2000
Archibald Prize 2000
Archibald Prize 2000
Archibald
Arch
Archibald
Archibald